The Goughs Canyon Formation is a geologic formation in southeastern Humboldt County, Nevada.

It preserves fossils dating back to the Mississippian stage of the Carboniferous period.

See also

 List of fossiliferous stratigraphic units in Nevada
 Paleontology in Nevada

References
 

Carboniferous geology of Nevada
Geography of Humboldt County, Nevada
Mississippian United States
Geologic formations of Nevada
Carboniferous southern paleotropical deposits